Russki and Russky (pl. Russkies) are ethnic slurs for Russians, derived from the Russian word  ("Russians"). Those terms may also refer to citizens of Russia regardless of ethnic background.

The terms may also refer to:
 Russky Island, an island off Vladivostok, Russia
 Russky Island (Kara Sea), off the northern coast of Russia
 Russky Bridge, between the city of Vladivostok and Russky Island
 Russkies, a 1987 American drama film

See also
 Roski (disambiguation)
 Rozki (disambiguation)